Hohe Wurzel may refer to two mountains in Germany:

Hohe Wurzel (Hunsrück), in Rhineland-Palatinate
Hohe Wurzel (Taunus), in Hesse